Arena polo is a fast-paced version of polo played outdoors on an enclosed all-weather surface, or in an indoor arena.  Hurlingham Polo Association (HPA, Great Britain) and US Polo Association (USPA, USA ) have established their own rules for arena polo, and these rules are often used in other countries as well.

Unlike outdoor polo, which is played on a 10-acre field, arena polo is played on 300 feet by 150 feet field, enclosed by walls of four or more feet in height. The normal game consists of four chukkas, or periods, of seven and one-half minutes each. A polo ball is similar to a mini soccer ball, larger than the hard plastic ball used outdoors. The arena game is played on a dirt surface with the ball bouncing on the uneven surface and off the arena wall.

Arena polo is typically far more financially accessible than outdoor polo. Club membership fees are usually lesser in comparison, in large part because an arena does not have the high annual maintenance cost of a grass field. Player investment is often smaller because, at a minimum, only two horses are needed to play a regulation arena polo match. Rather than a dedicated truck and large trailer, a bumper-pull trailer and a SUV is usually sufficient for transporting the horses of the arena polo player.

Arena polo can be played year-round, which is attractive to many players because it makes progress in the sport easier and quicker. The most popular season for arena polo is winter.

See also
 U.S. intercollegiate arena polo champions
 Beach polo, a variant of arena polo played on sand

References

Polo